James Norman Stevens was an English cricketer active from 1937 to 1955 who played for Northamptonshire (Northants). He was born in Bexhill-on-Sea on 4 June 1910 and died in Ipswich on 2 December 1993. He appeared in seven first-class matches as a righthanded batsman who bowled right arm fast medium. He scored 76 runs with a highest score of 19 and took nine wickets with a best performance of three for 85.

Notes

1910 births
1993 deaths
English cricketers
Northamptonshire cricketers
Free Foresters cricketers
Suffolk cricketers